Appertiella is a genus of an aquatic plant of the family Hydrocharitaceae described as a genus in 1982. There is only one known species, Appertiella hexandra, endemic to Madagascar.

References

Hydrocharitaceae
Hydrocharitaceae genera
Monotypic Alismatales genera
Aquatic plants
Endemic flora of Madagascar